Siliquofera is a monotypic genus of bush crickets in the subfamily Phyllophorinae.  The Orthoptera species file includes only one species Siliquofera grandis, which Blanchard named in 1853, originally placing it the genus Phyllophora.

English names names have included the "hooded bush cricket" and "giant katydid" indicating its size and the shape of the pronotum.  This insect is sometimes kept in captivity, surviving on food plants such as bramble, but the species originates from New Guinea; the type locality was described as "Hollandia" (Jayapura) in Irian Jaya, with specimens placed in the Museum of Natural History (MNHN), Paris.

Gallery

References

External links
 
 

Orthoptera of Asia
Ensifera genera
Tettigoniidae
Monotypic Orthoptera genera
Taxa described in 1903